Cuban heel may refer to:
 Stocking with a heel made with folded over and sewn reinforcement
 High-heeled footwear

See also
 Beatle boots